Johanna Atkinson (née Jackson) (born 17 January 1985) is a British race walker, and Commonwealth champion from New Marske in Redcar and Cleveland. Johanna's mother Maureen Jackson, a professional sporting coach, coached Johanna and supported her throughout her Olympic journey.

Johanna Jackson married Dave Atkinson in St Thomas's Church in December 2012. Johanna acted as a batonbearer when the 2022 Commonwealth Games Queen's Baton Relay came to Redcar.

Achievements

References

1985 births
Living people
People from Redcar
Athletes from Yorkshire
British female racewalkers
English female racewalkers
Olympic female racewalkers
Olympic athletes of Great Britain
Athletes (track and field) at the 2008 Summer Olympics
Commonwealth Games gold medallists for England
Commonwealth Games gold medallists in athletics
Athletes (track and field) at the 2012 Summer Olympics
Athletes (track and field) at the 2006 Commonwealth Games
Athletes (track and field) at the 2010 Commonwealth Games
World Athletics Championships athletes for Great Britain
British Athletics Championships winners
Commonwealth Games competitors for England
Alumni of Teesside University
Medallists at the 2010 Commonwealth Games